Bassel is an Arabic given name. It should not be confused with the French surname Bassil. 

People with the name include:

People
Bassel al-Araj (1984–2017), Palestinian activist, author and pharmacist
Bassel al-Assad (1962–1994), Syrian colonel, and politician, the eldest son of President of Syria Hafez al-Assad and the older brother of (later) President Bashar al-Assad
Bassel Atallah, Syrian Canadian entrepreneur, co-founder of SSENSE 
Bassel Bawji (born 1989), Lebanese American basketball player
Bassel Fleihan (1963–2005), Lebanese politician, legislator and minister
Bassel El Gharbawy (born 1977), Egyptian judoka
Bassel Jradi (born 1993), Danish-Lebanese football player
Bassel Khaiat (born 1977), Syrian actor
Bassel Khartabil also known as Bassel Safadi (1981–2015), Palestinian Syrian open-source software developer
Bassel Mashhour (born 1982), Egyptian water polo player
Bassel Al-Rayes (born 1979), Syrian-born Qatari handball player 
Bassel Al Shaar (born 1982), Syrian football player
Bassel Shehadeh (1984–2012), Syrian Christian film producer and IT Engineer, activist

See also
Bassil
Saint-Jean-de-Bassel, a commune in the Moselle department in Grand Est in north-eastern France

Arabic masculine given names